Hrianykivka is a village in Kupiansk Raion (district) in Kharkiv Oblast of eastern Ukraine, at about  east by south from the centre of Kharkiv city.

The village came under attack by Russian forces in 2022, during the Russian invasion of Ukraine, but was later liberated as of 15 September amid 2022 Ukrainian Kharkiv counteroffensive when Ukrainian forces advanced to the east side of Oskil River from another newly liberated town, Dvorichna. It was recaptured by the Russian army in February 2023.

References

Villages in Kupiansk Raion